The International Coordination of Revolutionary Parties and Organizations (ICOR) is an association of more than 40 "autonomous, independent and self-reliant" communist parties and organizations. ICOR is composed heterogeneously, even in the light of the specific programs of its member organizations and was founded on 6 October 2010.

Goals 
The aim of ICOR is to overcome the "imperialist world system" in a "revolutionary transformation" and to establish the "dictatorship of the proletariat". ICOR follows "an open-door policy" to other organizations seeking similar goals.

In their work, ICOR is based on the assumption that socialism in the Soviet Union was destroyed in 1956 and the country was transformed from within into a capitalist system by a "new class of bureaucrats" which had taken over the power.

Bridging the divide 
United in the ICOR, are various organizations of varying size and composition as well as some with different ideological and political principles. The establishing of ICOR as a coalition of communist organizations with different programs was seen as a breakthrough in overcoming the divide in the Marxist-Leninist and revolutionary movement.

ICOR thinks to establish a joint ideological and political line takes a long process on the basis of joint field experience from developing "cooperation in a few essential questions [...] to cooperation in all essential matters."

The heterogeneity of the organization, according to the ICOR, has its origins in the fragmentation and division of the worldwide Marxist-Leninist and labour movement since the 20th Congress of the Communist Party of the Soviet Union in 1956 and in the very different evolution of social conditions in the different countries.

Internationally ICOR cooperates with the International League for People's Struggle (ILPS) through the Anti-Imperialist and Anti-Fascist United Front (AIAFUF), which is planned to be formally launched in early 2021.

Reconstruction in Kobanê 
In 2015 ICOR organized International Brigades for contributing to the reconstruction of the Syrian Kurdish town Kobanê, which had suffered severe damages by heavy attacks of the Islamic State. From June to October 2015 volunteers from several countries are supposed to build a new hospital.

Member organizations
The following organizations and parties are known as ICOR members:

References

External links

 
Anti-revisionist internationals
Organizations established in 2010
Supraorganizations